Bhikaiji Rustom Cama (24 September 1861 – 13 August 1936) or simply as, Madam Cama, was one of the prominent figures in the Indian independence movement.

Bhikaiji Cama was born in Bombay (now Mumbai) in a large, affluent Parsi Zoroastrian family. Her parents, Sorabji Framji Patel and Jaijibai Sorabji Patel, were well known in the city, where her father Sorabji—a lawyer by training and a merchant by profession—was an influential member of the Parsi community.

She unfurled the first version of flag of independent India on August 21, 1907, when an International Socialist Conference was being held at Stuttgart, a city in Germany.

Like many Parsi girls of the time, Bhikhaiji attended Alexandra Girls' English Institution. Bhikhaiji was by all accounts a diligent, disciplined child with a flair for languages.

On 3 August 1885, she married Rustom Cama, who was the son of K. R. Cama. Her husband was a wealthy, pro-British lawyer who aspired to enter politics. It was not a happy marriage, and Bhikhaiji spent most of her time and energy in philanthropic activities and social work.

Activism
In October 1896, the Bombay Presidency was hit first by famine, and shortly thereafter by bubonic plague. Bhikhaiji joined one of the many teams working out of Grant Medical College (which would subsequently become Haffkine's plague vaccine research centre), in an effort to provide care for the afflicted, and (later) to inoculate the healthy. Cama subsequently contracted the plague herself but survived. As she was severely weakened, she was sent to Britain for medical care in 1902.

She was preparing to return to India in 1904 when she came in contact with Shyamji Krishna Varma, who was well known in London's Indian community for fiery nationalist speeches he gave in Hyde Park. Through him, she met Dadabhai Naoroji, then president of the British Committee of the Indian National Congress, and for whom she came to work as private secretary. Together with Naoroji and Singh Rewabhai Rana, Cama supported the founding of Varma's Indian Home Rule Society in February 1905. In London, she was told that her return to India would be prevented unless she would sign a statement promising not to participate in nationalist activities. She refused. 

That same year Cama relocated to Paris, where—together with S. R. Rana and Munchershah Burjorji Godrej—she co-founded the Paris Indian Society. Together with other notable members of the movement for Indian sovereignty living in exile, Cama wrote, published (in the Netherlands and Switzerland) and distributed revolutionary literature for the movement, including Bande Mataram (founded in response to the Crown ban on the poem Vande Mataram) and later Madan's Talwar (in response to the execution of Madan Lal Dhingra). These weeklies were smuggled into India through the French colony of Pondichéry.

On 22 August 1907, Cama attended the second Socialist Congress at Stuttgart, Germany, where she described the devastating effects of a famine that had struck the Indian subcontinent. In her appeal for human rights, equality and autonomy from Great Britain, she unfurled what she called the "Flag of Indian Independence". 

It has been speculated that this moment may have been an inspiration to African American writers and intellectuals W. E. B. Du Bois in writing his 1928 novel Dark Princess.  Cama's flag, a modification of the Calcutta Flag, was co-designed by Cama, and would later serve as one of the templates from which the current national flag of India was created.

In 1909, following Madan Lal Dhingra's assassination of William Hutt Curzon Wyllie, an aide to the Secretary of State for India, Scotland Yard arrested several key activists living in Great Britain, The British Government requested Cama's extradition, but the French Government refused to cooperate. In return, the British Government seized Cama's inheritance. Lenin reportedly invited her to reside in the Soviet Union, but she declined.

Influenced by Christabel Pankhurst and the Suffragette movement, Bhikhaiji Cama was vehement in her support for gender equality. Speaking in Cairo, Egypt in 1910, she asked, "I see here the representatives of only half the population of Egypt. May I ask where is the other half? Sons of Egypt, where are the daughters of Egypt? Where are your mothers and sisters? Your wives and daughters?" Cama's stance with respect to the vote for women was, however, secondary to her position on Indian independence; in 1920, upon meeting Herabai and Mithan Tata, two Parsi women outspoken on the issue of the right to vote, Cama is said to have sadly shaken her head and observed: "'Work for Indian's freedom and [i]ndependence. When India is independent women will not only [have] the right to [v]ote, but all other rights.'"

Exile and death

With the outbreak of World War I in 1914, France and Britain became allies, and all the members of Paris India Society except Cama and Singh Rewabhai Rana left the country (Cama had been advised by fellow-socialist Jean Longuet to go to Spain with M.P. Tirumal Acharya). She and Rana were briefly arrested in October 1914 when they tried to agitate among Punjab Regiment troops that had just arrived in Marseilles on their way to the front. They were required to leave Marseilles, and Cama then moved to Rana's wife's house in Arcachon, near Bordeaux. In January 1915, the French government deported Rana and his whole family to the Caribbean island of Martinique, and Cama was sent to Vichy, where she was interned. In bad health, she was released in November 1917 and permitted to return to Bordeaux provided that she report weekly to the local police. Following the war, Cama returned to her home at 25, Rue de Ponthieu in Paris.

Cama remained in exile in Europe until 1935, when, gravely ill and paralyzed by a stroke that she had suffered earlier that year, she petitioned the British government through Sir Cowasji Jehangir to be allowed to return home. Writing from  Paris on 24 June 1935, she acceded to the requirement that she renounce seditionist activities. Accompanied by Jehangir, she arrived in Bombay in November 1935 and died nine months later, aged , at Parsi General Hospital on 13 August 1936.

Legacy

Bikhaiji Cama bequeathed most of her personal assets to the Avabai Petit Orphanage for girls, now the Bai Avabai Framji Petit Girls' High School, which established a trust in her name. Rs. 54,000 (1936: £39,300; $157,200) went to her family's fire temple, the Framji Nusserwanjee Patel Agiary at Mazgaon, in South Bombay.

Several Indian cities have streets and places named after Bhikhaiji Cama, or Madame Cama as she is also known. On 26 January 1962, India's 11th Republic Day, the Indian Posts and Telegraphs Department issued a commemorative stamp in her honour.

In 1997, the Indian Coast Guard commissioned a Priyadarshini-class fast patrol vessel ICGS Bikhaiji Cama after Bikhaiji Cama.

A high-rise office complex in the posh location of South Delhi which accommodates major Government Offices and companies such as EPFO,  Jindal Group, SAIL, GAIL, EIL etc. is named as Bhikaji Cama Place in tribute to her.

Following Cama's 1907 Stuttgart address, the flag she raised there was smuggled into British India by Indulal Yagnik and is now on display at the Maratha and Kesari Library in Pune. In 2004, politicians of the BJP, India's political party, attempted to identify a later design (from the 1920s) as the flag Cama raised in Stuttgart. The flag Cama raised – misrepresented as "original national Tricolour" – has an (Islamic) crescent and a (Hindu) sun, which the later design does not have.

Further reading
 
 .
 .

Notes

Further reading

 .

1861 births
1936 deaths
Indian independence activists from Maharashtra
Parsi people
Indian exiles
Indian expatriates in France
India House
Politicians from Mumbai
19th-century Indian politicians
20th-century Indian politicians